This is the discography for American rock band MS MR.

Albums

Studio albums

Extended plays

Singles

Promotional singles

Notes

Music videos

Remixes

References 

Discographies of American artists
Alternative rock discographies